The Fèsta de ƚa Sènsa was a feast of the Republic of Venice held on the occasion of the feast of the Ascension (in the Venetian language, Sensa) and still celebrated as a recreation today.  It commemorated two significant dates in the Republic's history; the first being May 9, 1000, when the Doge Pietro II Orseolo rescued the denizens of Dalmatia imperiled by the Slavs.  The aforementioned date marked the onset of Venetian extension in the Adriatic.

The second event commemorated took place in 1177 when the Doge Sebastiano Ziani, Pope Alexander III and the Holy Roman Emperor, Frederick Barbarossa agreed to the Treaty of Venice which ended the long-standing differences between the Pontificate and the Holy Roman Empire.

On the occasion of this festival was held the ceremony of the Marriage of the Sea (It. Sposalizio del Mare).  This ceremony is recreated annually with the Mayor of Venice taking on the traditional role which was historically executed by the Doge.

References

External links
 The Festa della Sensa Commission - Comitato Festa della Sensa

Annual events in Italy
Festivals in Venice
Holidays based on the date of Easter
May observances
Spring (season) events in Italy